Avondale Historic District may refer to:

Avondale Historic District (Alexander City, Alabama), listed on the National Register of Historic Places in Tallapoosa County, Alabama
Avondale Historic District (Jacksonville, Florida), listed on the National Register of Historic Places in Duval County, Florida